Thomas Cape MBE (5 October 1868 in Cockermouth, Cumberland – 1947) was the Labour Party Member of Parliament (MP) for Workington from 1918 to 1945.

Before entering the House of Commons, Thomas Cape, son of William Cape, worked as a miner for twenty-five years between the ages of 13 and 38. He became General Secretary of the Cumberland Miners Association, and was awarded the M.B.E. in 1917. He died in 1947.

Personal
Cape, whose father had also worked as a miner, married Dinah Hodgson in 1890: the marriage produced four recorded sons and three recorded daughters. One son being killed in action WW1 1918.

References

External links 
 
genealogy site

1868 births
1947 deaths
Labour Party (UK) MPs for English constituencies
Miners' Federation of Great Britain-sponsored MPs
People from Cockermouth
English miners
UK MPs 1918–1922
UK MPs 1922–1923
UK MPs 1923–1924
UK MPs 1924–1929
UK MPs 1929–1931
UK MPs 1931–1935
UK MPs 1935–1945
English trade unionists
Members of the Order of the British Empire